Gabriel Bouffier (2 December 1918 – 2 July 1982) was a French racing cyclist. He rode in the 1939 Tour de France.

References

1918 births
1982 deaths
French male cyclists
Place of birth missing